The Maloata Village Site is a prehistoric village site on the northwestern coast of the island of Tutuila in the United States territory of American Samoa.  The archaeologically sensitive site includes a variety of stone features, principally stone fences and retaining walls, with evidence from excavation of human habitation.  Radiocarbon dating from one of its test pits yielded a date range of CE 550–1000, identifying the site as one of the oldest known on the island.  According to oral tradition, the Maloata area was reserved for use by relatively high-status chieftains.

The site was listed on the National Register of Historic Places in 1997.

See also
National Register of Historic Places listings in American Samoa

References

Tutuila
Archaeological sites on the National Register of Historic Places in American Samoa
Buildings and structures in American Samoa